IRGC Cooperation Bonyad ( lit. The Cooperative Foundation of the Revolutionary Guards) is a Bonyad in Iran, under control of Islamic Revolutionary Guard Corps.

Sanctions
The US Treasury Department put sanctions on the foundation in December 2010.

References

Islamic Revolutionary Guard Corps
Foundations based in Iran